William Alfred Ismay  (10 April 1910 – 13 January 2001) was a librarian, writer and collector in Wakefield, West Yorkshire known for his significant collection of post-war studio pottery. The collection called the W.A. Ismay Collection was bequeathed to the Yorkshire Museum and is one of the world's largest collections of 20th-century studio pottery. It includes work by Bernard Leach, Hans Coper, Shoji Hamada, Takeshi Yasuda, David Leach Dan Arbeid and Lucie Rie.

Early life
Born in Wakefield, an only child, his father was a trouser presser and his mother a school teacher. He attended Wakefield Grammar School and studied classics at Leeds University. Ismay was stationed in India during the Second World War as  a signalman in the Royal Signals Corps

From 1955 Ismay collected 3,600 pots from 500 makers. By the time of his retirement in 1975 he was head librarian at Hemsworth Library.  In 2014 a blue plaque was unveiled in his honour.

Gallery

References

External links
Official website

1910 births
2001 deaths
Members of the Order of the British Empire
English art collectors
Alumni of the University of Leeds
People from Wakefield
English librarians
British Army personnel of World War II
Royal Corps of Signals soldiers
Military personnel from Yorkshire